Juana "Nani" Fernández Ruiz (22 February 1923 – 9 November 1960) was a Spanish film actress.

Selected filmography
 Lola Leaves for the Ports (1947)
 Ninety Minutes (1949)
 Wings of Youth (1949)
 A Tale of Two Villages (1951)
 The Song of Sister Maria (1952)
 An Impossible Crime (1954)
 Last Stand in the Philippines (1955)
 The Lost City (1955)
 The Legion of Silence (1956)
 The Cat (1956)

References

Bibliography 
 Pepe Coira. Antonio Román: un cineasta de la posguerra. Editorial Complutense, 2004.

External links 
 

1923 births
1960 deaths
Actresses from Madrid
Spanish film actresses
20th-century Spanish actresses
Burials at Cementerio de la Almudena